Damrong Pachonyut (born 23 September 1932) is a Thai former sports shooter. He competed at the 1972, 1976 and the 1984 Summer Olympics.

References

1932 births
Living people
Damrong Pachonyut
Damrong Pachonyut
Shooters at the 1972 Summer Olympics
Shooters at the 1976 Summer Olympics
Shooters at the 1984 Summer Olympics
Place of birth missing (living people)
Asian Games medalists in shooting
Shooters at the 1978 Asian Games
Medalists at the 1978 Asian Games
Damrong Pachonyut
Damrong Pachonyut